Yakov Kazyansky (born Kuybyshev, 30 August 1948) is a Russian musician. He has been named an Honoured Worker of Culture of the Russian Federation (Заслуженный работник культуры Российской Федерации).

Trained as a jazz pianist and composer, he currently works in Yaroslavl, where he is musical director of the Yaroslavl Puppet Theatre and head of the music section of the Yaroslavl State Theatre. Both of his daughters live in the United States with their husbands, but Kazyansky himself has stated he prefers to remain in Russia.

References

Audio samples
Ballad from the television movie New Year’s Adventures
Composition Monkey from the television movie New Year’s Adventures
Dedicated to Billy Taylor jazz composition by Ya.Kazyansky (piano part – Ya.Kazyansky)

External links
The official web-site of Yakov Kazyansky

Russian composers
Russian male composers
1948 births
Living people
Musicians from Samara, Russia
Gnessin State Musical College alumni